Aki Heikkinen (born 24 February 1980 in Vieremä) is a Finnish decathlete. His personal best result was 8188 points, achieved in August 2000 in Lahti.

Achievements

References

1980 births
Living people
People from Vieremä
Finnish decathletes
Athletes (track and field) at the 2000 Summer Olympics
Olympic athletes of Finland
World Athletics Championships athletes for Finland
Sportspeople from North Savo